Sir Richard Pryse, 1st Baronet (died 1651) was a Welsh politician who sat in the House of Commons from 1646 to 1648.

Pryse was the son of Sir John Pryse of Gogerddan and Abersychan and his wife Mary Bromley, daughter of Sir Henry Bromley of Shradon Castle, Shropshire. He was created baronet of Gogerddan on 9 August 1641.

In 1639 he was appointed High Sheriff of Cardiganshire and in 1646 elected Member of Parliament for Cardiganshire in the Short Parliament. He was excluded in 1648 under Pride's Purge. He is buried in Westminster Abbey.
 
Pryse married firstly Hester Myddelton daughter of Sir Hugh Myddelton, 1st Baronet, by whom he had three sons, and secondly Mary van Dyck, daughter of Patrick Ruthven and widow of Anthony van Dyck. He was succeeded successively by the two elder sons of his first marriage, Richard and Thomas.

References

External links
Welsh Biography Online - Pryse Family of Gogerddan

Year of birth missing
1651 deaths
Members of the Parliament of England (pre-1707) for constituencies in Wales
Baronets in the Baronetage of England
High Sheriffs of Cardiganshire
English MPs 1640–1648